Asia News Network (ANN) is a news coalition of 24 news organisations from various Asian countries. Headquartered in Singapore, it was established in 1999 to form an alliance and enhance co-operation between them and their respective journalists and newspapers. 

Through the coalition, members pool resources and expertise to offer in-depth coverage of regional and international issues by presenting local viewpoints on complex topics. Most newspapers in this coalition are also the newspaper of record in their respective countries.

Members
Asia News Network members consist of the following publications:

  The Straits Times
  The Korea Herald
  China Daily
  Gogo Mongolia
  The Japan News 
  Dawn
  The Statesman 
  The Island 
  Kuensel
  Kathmandu Post 
  Daily Star 
  Eleven Media
  The Nation 
  The Jakarta Post
  The Star
  Sin Chew Daily
  Phnom Penh Post
  Rasmei Kampuchea
  The Borneo Bulletin 
  Vietnam News
  Philippine Daily Inquirer 
  Vientiane Times

See also

 European Dailies Alliance
 Leading European Newspaper Alliance
 Grupo de Diarios América
 Latin American Newspaper Association

References

External links
 Asia News Network

Mass media in East Asia
Mass media in Southeast Asia
Organizations established in 1999
1999 establishments in Singapore